The B2FH paper was a landmark scientific paper on the origin of the chemical elements. The paper's title is Synthesis of the Elements in Stars, but it became known as B2FH from the initials of its authors: Margaret Burbidge, Geoffrey Burbidge, William A. Fowler, and Fred Hoyle. It was written from 1955 to 1956 at the University of Cambridge and Caltech, then published in Reviews of Modern Physics in 1957.

The B2FH paper reviewed stellar nucleosynthesis theory and supported it with astronomical and laboratory data. It identified nucleosynthesis processes that are responsible for producing the elements heavier than iron and explained their relative abundances. The paper became highly influential in both astronomy and nuclear physics.

Nucleosynthesis prior to 1957
Prior to the publication of the B2FH paper, George Gamow advocated a theory of the Universe in which almost all chemical elements, or equivalently atomic nuclei, were synthesized during the Big Bang. Gamow's theory (which differs from present-day Big Bang nucleosynthesis theory) would imply that the abundance of the chemical elements would remain mostly static over time. Hans Bethe and Charles L. Critchfield had shown that the conversion of hydrogen into helium by nuclear fusion could provide the energy required to power stars, by deriving the proton-proton chain (pp-chain) in 1938. Carl von Weizsäcker and Hans Bethe had independently derived the CNO cycle in 1938 and 1939, respectively. Thus, it was known by Gamow and others that the abundances of hydrogen and helium were not perfectly static. According to their view, fusion in stars would produce small amounts of helium, adding only slightly to its abundance from the Big Bang. This stellar nuclear power did not require substantial stellar nucleosynthesis. The elements from carbon upward remained a mystery.

Fred Hoyle offered a hypothesis for the origin of heavy elements. Beginning with a paper in 1946, and expanded upon in 1954, Hoyle proposed that all atomic nuclei heavier than lithium were synthesized in stars. Both theories agreed that some light nuclei (hydrogen, helium and a small amount of lithium) were not produced in stars, which became the now-accepted theory of Big Bang nucleosynthesis of H, He and Li.

Physics in the paper
The B2FH paper was ostensibly a review article summarising recent advances in the theory of stellar nucleosynthesis. However, it went beyond simply reviewing Hoyle's work, by incorporating observational measurements of elemental abundances published by the Burbidges, and Fowler's laboratory experiments on nuclear reactions. The result was a synthesis of theory and observation, which provided convincing evidence for Hoyle's hypothesis.

The theory predicted that the abundances of the elements would evolve over cosmological time, an idea which is testable by astronomical spectroscopy. Each element has a characteristic set of spectral lines, so stellar spectroscopy can be used to infer the atmospheric composition of individual stars. Observations indicate a strong negative correlation between a star's initial heavy element content (known as the metallicity) and its age. More recently formed stars tend to have higher metallicity.

The early Universe consisted of only the light elements formed during Big Bang nucleosynthesis. Stellar structure and the Hertzsprung–Russell diagram indicate that the length of the lifetime of a star depends greatly on its initial mass, with the most massive stars being very short-lived, and less massive stars are longer-lived. The B2FH paper argued that when a star dies, it will enrich the interstellar medium with 'heavy elements' (in this case all elements heavier than lithium), from which newer stars are formed.

The B2FH paper described key aspects of the nuclear physics and astrophysics involved in how stars produce these heavy elements. By scrutinizing the table of nuclides, the authors identified different stellar environments that could produce the observed isotopic abundance patterns and the nuclear processes that must be responsible for them. The authors invoke nuclear physics processes, now known as the p-process, r-process, and s-process, to account for the elements heavier than iron. The abundances of these heavy elements and their isotopes are roughly 100,000 times less than those of the major elements, which supported Hoyle's 1954 hypothesis of nuclear fusion within the burning shells of massive stars.

B2FH comprehensively outlined and analyzed the nucleosynthesis of the elements heavier than iron by the capture within stars of free neutrons. It advanced much less the understanding of the synthesis of the very abundant elements from silicon to nickel. The paper did not include the carbon-burning process, the oxygen-burning process and the silicon-burning process, each of which contribute to the elements from magnesium to nickel. Hoyle had already suggested that supernova nucleosynthesis could be responsible for these in his 1954 paper. Donald D. Clayton has attributed the lower number of citations to Hoyle's 1954 paper compared to B2FH as a combination of factors: the difficulty of digesting Hoyle's 1954 paper even for his B2FH coauthors, and among astronomers generally; to Hoyle's having described its key equation only in words rather than writing it prominently in his paper; and to Hoyle's incomplete review of the B2FH draft.

Writing of the paper
The Caltech nuclear physicist William Alfred Fowler used his sabbatical leave to visit Hoyle in Cambridge from 1954 to 1955. The pair invited Margaret Burbidge and Geoffrey Burbidge to join them in Cambridge, as the couple had recently published extensive work on stellar abundances that would be required to test Hoyle's hypothesis. The quartet collaborated on several projects whilst in Cambridge; Fowler and Hoyle began work on a review that would become B2FH. Fowler returned to Caltech with the work far from complete, and encouraged the Burbidges to join him in California. Both of the Burbidges had temporary positions created for them in 1956 at Caltech by Fowler for this purpose. The first complete draft was completed by the Burbidges in 1956 at Caltech, after adding extensive astronomical observations and experimental data to support the theory. Margaret Burbidge, the paper's first author, completed much of the work whilst pregnant. The final paper is 104 pages long, with 34 plots, 4 photographic plates, and 22 tables; despite this length, it does not have an abstract.

Some have presumed that Fowler was the leader of the group because the writing and submission for publication were done at Caltech in 1956, but Geoffrey Burbidge has stated that this is a misconception. Fowler, though an accomplished nuclear physicist, was still learning Hoyle's theory in 1955 and later stated that Hoyle was the intellectual leader. The Burbidges also learnt Hoyle's theory during 1954–55 in Cambridge. "There was no leader in the group," G. Burbidge wrote in 2008, "we all made substantial contributions".

Recognition
B2FH drew scientific attention to the field of nuclear astrophysics. By reviewing the theory of stellar nucleosynthesis and supporting it with observational evidence, B2FH firmly established the theory among astronomers.

Fowler was awarded half of the 1983 Nobel Prize in Physics, which has sometimes been erroneously stated was for his contributions to B2FH. The Nobel committee stated that the prize was for Fowler's decades of experimental work on the rates of thermonuclear reactions in stellar cores. Fowler's contributions to B2FH included the nuclear physics of the s-process and the r-process. Some have argued that Fred Hoyle deserved similar recognition for theoretical work on the topic, and contend that his unorthodox views concerning the Big Bang stopped him being awarded a share of the Nobel Prize. Geoffrey Burbidge wrote in 2008, "Hoyle should have been awarded a Nobel Prize for this and other work. On the basis of my private correspondence, I believe that a major reason for his exclusion was that W. A. Fowler was believed to be the leader of the group." Burbidge stated that this perception is not true and pointed to Hoyle's earlier papers from 1946 and 1954. Burbidge said that "Hoyle's work has been undercited in part because it was published in an astrophysical journal, and a new one at that (the very first volume, in fact), whereas B2FH was published in a well-established physics journal, Reviews of Modern Physics. When B2FH was first written, preprints were widely distributed to the nuclear physics community. Willy Fowler was very well known as a leader in that community, and the California Institute of Technology already had a news bureau that knew how to spread the word."

In 2007 a conference was held at Caltech in Pasadena, California to commemorate the 50th anniversary of the publication of B2FH, where Geoffrey Burbidge presented remarks on the writing of B2FH.

See also
Alpher–Bethe–Gamow paper

Further reading

References

{{DISPLAYTITLE:B2FH paper}}

Nuclear physics
Nucleosynthesis
Astrophysics
1957 documents
1957 in science
Physics papers